Nasim Akhtar is the 1st Vice Chancellor of Chandpur Science and Technology University, previously worked as a professor in the Department of CSE and  the director of the Computer Center,  Dhaka University of Engineering & Technology, Gazipur. Currently, he writes about Bangladesh's socioeconomic conditions and how it can be improved and how Bangladesh's education sector play a role in uplifting itself from a developing country to a developed one.

Bibliography 

 Bangladesh Open University Diploma in Computer Application (DCSA), 2nd semester  “Operating Systems”
 Swapno O Safollyer Rosayon (স্বপ্ন ও সাফল্যের রসায়ন).

See also 
 Md. Akhtaruzzaman
 List of vice-chancellors of Bangladeshi universities
 Muhammed Zafar Iqbal
 Anisul Hoque

References 

1973 births
Living people
Chandpur Science and Technology University
Non-fiction writers
Bengali-language writers
Bangladeshi academics
Kyiv Polytechnic Institute alumni